Willemina ("Wilma") Cornelia Adriana van Rijn-van Hofwegen (born 17 July 1971) is a former freestyle swimmer from the Netherlands, who was a member of the Dutch Women's 4×100 m freestyle relay Team that won the silver medal at the 2000 Summer Olympics in Sydney, Australia.

Van Hofwegen was born in Vlaardingen, and is married to former swimmer Michael van Rijn, who also competed for Holland.  She competed in the silver medal-winning relay team alongside Inge de Bruijn, Thamar Henneken and Manon van Rooijen. She also competed at the 1996 Summer Olympics in Atlanta, United States.

References
Profile on Zwemkroniek
 Dutch Olympic Committee

1971 births
Living people
Olympic swimmers of the Netherlands
Swimmers at the 1996 Summer Olympics
Swimmers at the 2000 Summer Olympics
Olympic silver medalists for the Netherlands
People from Vlaardingen
Dutch female freestyle swimmers
Medalists at the FINA World Swimming Championships (25 m)
European Aquatics Championships medalists in swimming
Medalists at the 2000 Summer Olympics
Olympic silver medalists in swimming
Sportspeople from South Holland